is a district located in Nara Prefecture, Japan.

As of 2003, the district has an estimated population of 14,624 and a density of 293.36 persons per km2. The total area is 49.85 km2.Takatori Kokusai High School is in the area.

Towns and villages
Takatori
Asuka

Districts in Nara Prefecture